The Stadium of Fire is a nearly annual event held in the Brigham Young University's LaVell Edwards Stadium on or very near the United States' Independence Day. It is one of the main events for the America's Freedom Festival. This patriotic extravaganza with a cast of thousands features the largest stadium fireworks show in the USA. It is also televised worldwide to US troops and their families on American Forces TV, as a gift from America's Freedom Festival.

The Stadium of Fire was created by Merrill Osmond & Alan Osmond in 1980 and has become one of the largest Independence Day celebrations in the United States. With super star performers and also the Stadium of Fire Dancers.  For the past 13 years it has been created and produced by Baruch Gayton Entertainment Group.

TV Special

References

External links

Brigham Young University
Independence Day (United States)
Festivals in Utah
Tourist attractions in Provo, Utah
Recurring events established in 1980
1980 establishments in Utah